Elmer Elephant is a Silly Symphony cartoon short produced by The Walt Disney Company, directed by Wilfred Jackson and released on March 28, 1936.

Plot

Elmer Elephant arrives in the yard below Tillie Tiger's treehouse, where several other animal children are celebrating Tillie's birthday. He has a crush on Tillie, and attempts to give her a bouquet of flowers. However, Joey the Hippo blows out the candles a bit too hard as Elmer arrives, spattering cake icing all over Elmer's face. Tilly fusses over Elmer, cleans him up and accepts his flowers. She then goes into her treehouse to get something, telling Elmer to have fun at the party until she returns.

After Tillie leaves, a jealous tiger boy leads the other children in teasing Elmer about his trunk, calling it a "funny nose like a rubber hose". Finally driven away from the party, Elmer goes to a local pond to sulk; upset at his reflection, he tries to fold up his nose, but it pops back out again. He kicks his trunk in frustration, causing it to hit his face, and begins to cry. An elderly giraffe arrives, telling how he was once teased himself over his neck, but learned to ignore it. He shows Elmer some pelicans that look like Jimmy Durante, pointing out that Elmer is not the only one with a funny nose.

A fire breaks out at Tillie's treehouse, trapping her inside. The monkey fire brigade and the other animal children attempt to put it out, but the fire comes to life and fights back. Elmer, with assistance from the Giraffe and the pelicans, hurries back and uses his trunk like a fire hose, extinguishing the blaze. He catches Tillie with his trunk as she falls from the disintegrating house, earning the other children's respect and Tillie's love. Despite her home being destroyed, Tillie and Elmer share a kiss, hiding behind Elmer's ear for privacy.

Later appearances
Elmer is theorized to be the precursor of Dumbo; the common trait of both characters being that they have insecurities about a specific body part they get ridiculed for (in this case, Elmer's trunk) and eventually becoming a hero through the use of the body part in question (in this case, Elmer using his trunk to put out the fire and saving Tilly)

Elmer would later go on to star in a serial in the Silly Symphony comic strip. "The Life and Adventures of Elmer Elephant," appearing from October 27, 1935, to January 12, 1936, retold the story of the Elmer short. Three years later, Elmer was featured in the strip again, in a continuity called "Timid Elmer". This story was based on a planned second Elmer short, which was abandoned before completion. In this story, published December 4, 1938 to February 12, 1939, Elmer's girlfriend Tillie Tiger is tired of his cowardice, and takes up with a bully, Gooch Gorilla. After talking to a wise giraffe, Elmer gains the confidence to fight the bullies and win back Tillie's respect.

Like the Three Little Pigs before him, he would also become a popular character in merchandising. However, he never made another theatrical appearance again, with the exceptions of the crowd shots in the later Silly Symphonies short Toby Tortoise Returns and a cameo appearance in Who Framed Roger Rabbit alongside Joey Hippo. Most recently, Elmer and Tillie have made brief but notable cameos in Mickey Mouse episode "Carried Away" where they are tourists in Niagara Falls.

Today, the Elmer Elephant short can be found on the 2001 Walt Disney Treasures DVD box set Silly Symphonies. Since 2001, it has also been included as a bonus feature, alongside fellow Silly Symphony short The Flying Mouse, on DVD/Blu-Ray releases of Dumbo. From 1983 to 1997, this short was also the featured subject of DTV's music video of English rock group Yes' "Owner of a Lonely Heart", and featured in one episode of Sing Me a Story with Belle.

Home media
The short was released on December 4, 2001 on Walt Disney Treasures: Silly Symphonies - The Historic Musical Animated Classics.

References

External links
 
 Elmer Elephant on the Encyclopedia of Disney Animated Shorts
 Elmer's profile in the Disney HooZoo

1936 films
1936 short films
1936 animated films
1930s Disney animated short films
Elephant, Elmer
Films directed by Wilfred Jackson
Films produced by Walt Disney
Animated films about elephants
Silly Symphonies
Films scored by Leigh Harline
Films about bullying
Films about tigers
1930s American films